The 1932 Kilkenny Senior Hurling Championship was the 38th staging of the Kilkenny Senior Hurling Championship since its establishment by the Kilkenny County Board.

On 13 November 1932, Mooncoin won the championship after a 6-04 to 5-05 defeat of Carrickshock in the final. It was their 10th championship title overall and their first title in three championship seasons.

Results

Final

References

Kilkenny Senior Hurling Championship
Kilkenny Senior Hurling Championship